Wallaroo Parish is one of the 54 parishes of Murray County, New South Wales, a cadastral unit for use on land titles. It is bounded by the Murrumbidgee River in the west, Ginninderra Creek in the south and Gooromon Ponds in the east. This area is just to the west of Dunlop. The Wallaroo road is the main road in the area, which comes off the Barton Highway. The parish is similar to the locality of Wallaroo.

References
Map showing proposed Federal Capital Territory and tenures of land within same, Charles Robt. Scrivener, 22 May 1909

Maps available at the NSW Dept. of Lands Parish map preservation project

Parishes of Murray County